Sergio Fiorentino (22 December 1927 – 22 August 1998) was a 20th-century Italian classical pianist whose sporadic performing career spanned five decades.
There is quite a bit of footage of his playing that survives, in addition to audio recordings. Recently, a complete concert recorded on video in 1994 has surfaced.

Music career
Fiorentino was born in Naples and studied at the Conservatorio San Pietro a Majella in Naples under Luigi Finizio and Paolo Denza, earned his diploma in 1946 and attended a master class of Carlo Zecchi in Salzburg in 1948.

His debut was at Carnegie Recital Hall, New York in 1953. The following year, while on tour in Argentina and Uruguay, he was in a near-fatal plane accident, forcing him to cut back on concert performances. This led to him becoming a teacher at Naples Conservatory, where he had once been a student.

In the late 1950s he made a new start in concert performances, both in his native country and in England. Many of his recordings were made during those years (1958–1965). But again, he withdrew from the concert stage, limiting his rare public appearances to his native country, and again started to regularly teach master classes.

He left Naples Conservatory in 1993 and began again to play more in public outside his native Italy, performing in Germany, France, Taiwan and the United States. 

He also made a series of recordings for Appian Publications & Recordings (APR) in Berlin during four sessions between 1994 and 1997. An augmented 10-CD set of these recordings was issued by Piano Classics in 2012. Negotiated and contracted engagements in Russia and Canada as well as a scheduled fifth recording session for APR could not be fulfilled due to his sudden death in his home in Naples on August 22, 1998.

Fraud with Concert Artists label
Beginning in 1994 through after his death in 1998, a large number of recordings by Fiorentino were released. Recordings made in Berlin from 1994 to 1997 were released on APR whereas earlier unissued material was put out by the Concert Artists label. In February 2007, Concert Artists admitted to falsely attributing music recorded by others to the late Joyce Hatto.  Subsequently, a CD of mazurkas by Fiorentino
produced by Concert Artists (CACD9002-2) has been found to
contain plagiarised tracks from three other performers.

Some of Fiorentino's recordings made during the late fifties and early sixties were issued after the original label's (Saga) failure under pseudonyms by the new owner (Marcel Rodd). The most frequently used pseudonym was "Paul Procopolis".

Fiorentino Edition - APR Recordings
Appian Publications & Recordings
 Vol. 1 - Scriabin - Rachmaninov - Prokofiev  (1995)
(Alexander Scriabin: Sonata No. 2 op.19; Sergei Rachmaninov: Sonata No. 2 op. 36; Sergei Prokofiev: Sonata No. 8 op. 84)
 Vol. 2 - Chopin - Schubert (1997)
(Fryderyk Chopin: Sonata No. 3 op. 58; Franz Schubert: Sonata No. 21 D960)
 Vol. 3 - Scriabin - Rachmaninov (1997)
(Alexander Scriabin: Sonata No. 1 op. 6 - Sonata No. 4 op. 30; Sergei Rachmaninov: Sonata No. 1 op. 28)
 Vol.4 - Bach (1998)
(Johann Sebastian Bach: Partita No. 1 - Violin Sonata No. 1 [Transcribed by Fiorentino] - Partita No. 4)
 Vol. 5 - Bach (Vol.2) (1998)
(Johann Sebastian Bach: Prelude and Fugue in D Major; French Suite No. 5; Suite from Violin Partita No. 3; Jesu, Joy of man's desiring [Transcribed by Myra Hess]; Prelude and Fugue in E flat Major)
 Vol. 6 - Schumann (1999)
(Robert Schumann: Fantasy in C Major op. 17; Arabeske op. 18; Novellette op. 21 No. 1; Sonata No. 2 op. 22; Romanze op. 28 No. 2; "Die Lotosblume" - "Widmung"  [Arranged by Fiorentino])
 Vol. 7 - Schubert (2003)
(Franz Schubert: Sonata No. 13; 4 Impromptus D 899; Sonata No. 4)
 Vol. 8 - Liszt (2004)
(Franz Liszt: Ballade No. 1 and No. 2; Funérailles; La Leggierezza; Waldesrauschen; Sonata in B minor)
 Vol. 9 - Franck (2005)
(César Franck: Prélude, Fugue et Variations op. 18 [Transcribed by Harold Bauer]; Prélude, Chorale et Fugue; Danse Lente; Prélude, Aria et Final) 
 Sergio Fiorentino in Germany - 1993 Live recordings (1995)
(Bach/Busoni, Beethoven; Chopin, Scriabin, Schumann, Liszt/Gounod, J. Strauss/Tausig, J. Strauss/Godowsky, Tchaikovsky, Brahms)
 The Early Recordings Vol. 1 (1999)
(The Contemplative Liszt)
 The Early Recordings Vol. 2 (1999)
(The Virtuoso Liszt)
 The Early Recordings Vol. 3 (2000)
(Liszt: Années de Pèlerinage Vol. I Suisse)
 The Early Recordings Vol. 4 (2002)
(Liszt: The Orchestral Recordings)
 The Early Recordings Vol. 5 (2006)
(Rachmaninov: 24 Preludes)
 The Early Recordings Vol. 6 (2008)
(Schumann: Carnaval; Kinderszenen; Arabeske; Symphonic Etudes)

Sergio Fiorentino Edition - Rhine Classics
 RH-006 | 6CD | SERGIO FIORENTINO - complete Rachmaninoff live [1987] > reviews
(complete solo piano works + Paganini Rhapsody, Piano Concerto No.1, Vocalise)
 RH-009 | 1CD | SERGIO FIORENTINO - live in Taiwan [1998] > reviews
(works by: Bach-Busoni, Beethoven, Scriabin, Rachmaninoff, Mendelssohn)
 RH-015 | 9CD | SERGIO FIORENTINO - live in USA [1996/98] > reviews
(works by: Albéniz, Bach, Beethoven, Brahms, Chopin, Franck, Godowsky, Liszt, Mendelssohn, Moszkowski, Rachmaninoff, Schubert, Schumann, Scriabin, R.Strauss, Tausig, Tchaikovsky)

References

External links
Short biography on the Bach-Cantatas.com website
Biography on site of Concert Artist/Fidelio Recordings (site closed down after the Hatto hoax had become known)
Discography, Reviews, Pictures at The Sergio Fiorentino Pages (c) by Ernest Lumpe
Carla Di Lena at Giornale della Musica Pages
Adriana Benignetti at Musica Progetto Pages
Riccardo Risaliti at Furcht Pages
About Sergio Fiorentino at Piano Street
Sergio Fiorentino Live in Taiwan on MusicWeb International
Sergio Fiorentino Live in Taiwan on Audiophile Audition

1927 births
1998 deaths
Italian classical pianists
male classical pianists
Italian male pianists
Musicians from Naples
20th-century classical pianists
20th-century classical musicians
20th-century Italian musicians
20th-century Italian male musicians